Solari di Udine SpA is an Italian company that designs and manufactures public information displays, historically split-flap displays. The company was founded in 1725 in Udine, a small town in northern Italy. Initially, the company specialized in clocks for towers. It began working with designer Gino Valle after World War II, and developed signs with four flaps, each with ten digits, to display the time. The company eventually designed displays with 40 flaps, with the help of Belgian inventor John Myer. The new displays could include numbers and letters, allowing for a much wider use.

The company's split-flap displays, commonly with white numbers on black flaps, won the Compasso d'Oro award in 1956. In this year, Solari sold its first moving sign to Liege railway station in Belgium. It subsequently sold thousands to airports and train stations. There is no known record of surviving Solari split-flap displays, though hundreds have been replaced with more modern displays across the world.

Specific displays
For its conversion into the TWA Hotel which opened in 2019, the full restoration of the TWA Flight Center at John F. Kennedy International Airport included its classic Solari split-flap message board with authentic original mechanical operation manufactured in Italy in 1962.
 The Solari board at 30th Street Station in Philadelphia, Pennsylvania, operated there from the 1970s to 2018, the last to operate in an Amtrak station. The board was subsequently moved to the Railroad Museum of Pennsylvania.
 Grand Central Terminal in New York City operated a Solari board from 1967 to 1985. Its removal upset the public, though subsequent displays mimic some aspects of the Solari board.

See also
 Cifra 3

References

External links
 

Italian brands
Italian companies established in 1725
Watch manufacturing companies of Italy
Clock manufacturing companies